The 2005 Sirius Satellite Radio at The Glen was the 22nd stock car race of the 2005 NASCAR Nextel Cup Series season and the 20th iteration of the event. The race was held on Sunday, August 14, 2005 in Watkins Glen, New York before a crowd of 85,000 at the shortened layout of Watkins Glen International, a  permanent road course. The race was extended from 90 to 92 laps due to a green–white–checker finish caused by an accident including Kurt Busch and Jorge Goeters in the bus stop. At race's end, Tony Stewart of Joe Gibbs Racing would defend his domination of the race on the final restart to win his 24th career NASCAR Nextel Cup Series win and his fifth of the season. To fill out the podium, Robby Gordon of Robby Gordon Motorsports and Boris Said of MB Sutton Motorsports would finish second and third, respectively.

Background 

Watkins Glen International (nicknamed "The Glen") is an automobile race track located in Watkins Glen, New York at the southern tip of Seneca Lake. It was long known around the world as the home of the Formula One United States Grand Prix, which it hosted for twenty consecutive years (1961–1980), but the site has been home to road racing of nearly every class, including the World Sportscar Championship, Trans-Am, Can-Am, NASCAR Sprint Cup Series, the International Motor Sports Association and the IndyCar Series.

Initially, public roads in the village were used for the race course. In 1956 a permanent circuit for the race was built. In 1968 the race was extended to six hours, becoming the 6 Hours of Watkins Glen. The circuit's current layout has more or less been the same since 1971, although a chicane was installed at the uphill Esses in 1975 to slow cars through these corners, where there was a fatality during practice at the 1973 United States Grand Prix. The chicane was removed in 1985, but another chicane called the "Inner Loop" was installed in 1992 after J.D. McDuffie's fatal accident during the previous year's NASCAR Winston Cup event.

The circuit is known as the Mecca of North American road racing and is a very popular venue among fans and drivers. The facility is currently owned by International Speedway Corporation.

Entry list 

*Marlin would have to sit the weekend out due to attending his father's funeral. While David Stremme would drive the #40 in pre-race activities, he was eventually switched to Scott Pruett for the race after Pruett did not qualify due to qualifying being cancelled.

Practice 
Originally, two practices were scheduled to occur during race weekend. However, rain would cancel Happy Hour, so only one practice would be run.

First and final practice 
The first and final practice was held on 1:20 PM EST, and would last one hour and 20 minutes.

Starting lineup 
Qualifying would occur on Saturday, August 13, at 11:10 AM EST. Drivers would each have two laps to set a fastest lap- whichever lap was fastest would be their official lap time.

However, rain would pour on the track during Anthony Lazzaro's run. After continuous downpour, NASCAR decided to scrap qualifying and make the starting lineup based on the current 2005 owner's points. As a result, Tony Stewart of Joe Gibbs Racing would win the pole.

Race results

References 

2005 NASCAR Nextel Cup Series
NASCAR races at Watkins Glen International
August 2005 sports events in the United States
2005 in sports in New York (state)